Club de Deportes Santa Cruz is a football club based in Santa Cruz, Chile. The club currently plays in the Chilean Primera Division B, the second tier of Chilean football. The club was founded  on May 25, 1913 as Unión Comercio. In 1983 the club was rechristened Unión Santa Cruz and a second time in 1998 to the current club name.

Honours
Segunda División: 2018
Tercera División: 1991
Cuarta División: 2012

Current squad

2021 Summer transfers

In

Out

External links
 Official site

Santa Cruz
Santa Cruz
1913 establishments in Chile